Martín Mondragón (born November 11, 1953) is a retired long-distance runner from Mexico, who won the 1988 edition of the Los Angeles Marathon.  Virtually unknown before the race, the 34-year-old set the course record and his personal record at 2:10:19 after a battle with Mark Plaatjes, which positioned the L.A. Marathon amongst the top marathons worldwide.

He represented his native country at the 1988 Summer Olympics in Seoul, South Korea, where he finished in 57th place in the men's marathon, clocking 2:27:10.

He continued running into the masters division, winning the Boilermaker Road Race three times in the late 1990s.

Achievements

References

sports-reference

1953 births
Living people
Mexican male long-distance runners
Olympic athletes of Mexico
Athletes (track and field) at the 1988 Summer Olympics
Place of birth missing (living people)
Mexican masters athletes
20th-century Mexican people